Vilwaneswarar temple (also called Tiruvaikavur Temple or Thiruvaikavur Temple) is a Hindu temple dedicated to Shiva located in Thiruvaikavur, Tamil Nadu, India. Constructed in the Dravidian style of architecture, the temple is believed to have been built during the Cholas period in the 7th century. Shiva is worshipped as Vilwaneswarar and his consort Parvati as Valaikai Nayagi.

The presiding deity is revered in the 7th century Tamil Saiva canonical work, the Tevaram, written by Tamil saint poets known as the Nayanmars and classified as Paadal Petra Sthalam. A granite wall surrounds the temple, enclosing all its shrines. The temple has a five-tiered Rajagopuram, the gateway tower. 

The temple is open from 6am - 1 pm and 4-8:30 pm on all days. Four daily rituals and three yearly festivals are held at the temple, of which the Vaikasi Visagam, Adipooram and Navarathri uthsavam, Annabishekam and Theerthavari are some of the prominent festivals celebrated. The temple is maintained and administered by the Hindu Religious and Endowment Board of the Government of Tamil Nadu.

Legend

A saint named Thavanithi was performing his worship in the temple. A deer chased by a hunter held the aegis of the saint. The saint took the form of a tiger to frighten the hunter. The hunter out of fear climbed the Vilva tree in the temple, waiting for the tiger to relent. The tiger was relentless and the hunter in an effort to keep him awake all night spilled vilva leaves one by one the whole night. Incidentally the vilva leaves fell on a Shiva Lingam, under the tree. Since the day was Maha Shivaratri, the hunter got the blessings of Shiva as a result. The next day was to be the last day of the hunter. Yama, the death god approached the hunter to take away his soul. Dakshinamurthy (Guru) with his trishula (trident) and Nandi were driving Yama out of the temple. Shiva was unhappy about Nandi and just to avoid Shiva's wrath Nandi faces the temple entrance.  It is also believed that Vishnu performed his penance here to overcome the curse of a chaste woman - the Shiva here is called Ariyeesar hence. Brahma and Agni held theertham here to worship Shiva here.  The attributes of both Brahma and Agni was enhanced as a result. Saptamartrikas worshipped Shiva here by having a holy dip in Yama theertham, the temple tank here to regain the Ashtamasiddhi (powers) lost on account of a curse from the sage Uttala. Shiva and Parvati appeared here in the northern banks of Cauvery and Bhuma Devi is believed to have worshiped Shiva and the place is called Bhooomipuram hence. Shiva rescued the life of a child who was killed by a thief for his jewels on a Shivaratri and attained the name Makavaruleeswarar.

During the great deluge, the land was supposed to be destroyed and the world worshipped Shiva, who rose in the form of Vilva tree to save the land.  The presiding deity obtained the name Vilvavanehswarar hence. The temple is counted as one of the temples built on the northern banks of River Kaveri.

Architecture
Vilwaneswarar temple is dedicated to Shiva and is located in Thiruvaikavur, a village in the South Indian state of Tamil Nadu. The nearest railway station is in Kumbakonam, about 8 kilometres from the place. The nearest airport is in Trichy. The temple has a 3-tier Rajagopuram and an outer prakaram(closed precincts of a temple). The sanctum of Sakshinatheswarar is in the second precinct and the shrine of Amman is located perpendicular to the Swami shrine. The shrine is Nandi is located in front of Swami, with the Palipeeda and Dwajasthambam located right behind the Nandi. There is a Nataraja hall and a yagasalai. There are separate shrines for Natarajar, Somaskanda, Karpaga Vinayagar and Navagrahas. There are separate shrines for Nalvar, Dakshinamurthy, Arthanariswarar, Mahalakshmi, Arumugam, Brahma, Durga and Chandikeswarar. There are four water bodies associated with the temple, with the Yama theertha located right in front of the temple. There is no form of life that does not fear death.  The Yama theertha(Temple tank named after Lord Yama) here reduces the fear of life.  The Yama Theertham is one similar to the one present in Tiruneelivaneswarar temple in Trichy. Dakshinamurthy holding a soolam (trident).  There are two image of Chandikeswarar opposite to the shrine of Durga. The stucco image of the legend is sculpted in the entrance. There are images of other deities like Vishnu, Narayani, Bhairava, Surya, Chandra and Shani located in the second precinct. The temple is revered by the verses of Tirugnana Sambandar.

Religious significance

The temple finds mention in Tevaram, the 7th century 12 volume Saiva canonical work by Tamil saints, namely Appar, Sundarar and Campantar. It is one of the shrines of the 275 Paadal Petra Sthalams glorified in the Saiva canon. Sivarathiri is a famous occasion here and it garners a crowd of around 2 lakh people. The temple priests perform the puja (rituals) during festivals and on a daily basis. The temple rituals are performed four times a day; Kalasanthi at 6:00 a.m.,  Uchikalam at 12:00 a.m., Sayarakshai at 6:00 p.m,  and Arthajamam at 9:00 p.m.. Each ritual comprises four steps: abhisheka (sacred bath), alangaram (decoration), naivethanam (food offering) and deepa aradanai (waving of lamps) for Sivagurunathar and Aryambal. Masi Maham during the Tamil month of Maasi (February - March), Shivaratri in February- March and Panguni Uthiram during Panguni are the major festivals celebrated in the temple.

References

External links

Shiva temples in Thanjavur district
Padal Petra Stalam